Lawrence George Teeter (December 12, 1948 – July 31, 2005) was an American lawyer best known for representing Sirhan Sirhan, the man convicted of assassinating Robert F. Kennedy, from 1994–2005. 

Teeter signed on as Sirhan's lawyer in 1994 and repeatedly tried to get a retrial for his client in order to clear his name. However, he was unsuccessful in doing so right up to his death.

Besides Sirhan's case, Teeter also handled other cases, without charging a fee for many of them. In 1982, Teeter unsuccessfully defended Norma Jean Almodovar from a three-year state prison term for pandering, arguing that the 1982 law specifying the sentence was unconstitutional, an argument that was refused by the California 2nd District Court of Appeal. In 2002, he helped a group submit legal opposition to a planned redesign of Los Angeles' Hollywood Bowl. However, the redesign proceeded and the Bowl was reopened in 2004.

Teeter died in Conchitas, Mexico of advanced lymphoma.

References

External links 

Deaths from lymphoma
1948 births
2005 deaths
Deaths from cancer in Mexico
Lawyers from Los Angeles
20th-century American lawyers